Edgar Allan "Ted" Baldwin (25 September 1922 – 1 January 2008) was a member of the Queensland Legislative Assembly.

Biography
Baldwin was born in Moregatta, in the Tablelands Region of Queensland, the son of Allan Baldwin and his wife Ruby May (née Massey). He was educated at Brisbane State High School before graduating from the University of Queensland in 1950 with a Bachelor of Arts and Bachelor of Education.

He began his working life as a 12 year old doing a milk run for two years, and later worked as a sand, gravel and firewood carter for another two years. From 1939, he was a factory worker before attending university. After graduating, Baldwin was a school teacher until 1959.

On 16 June 1943, he married Reeva Clements and they had three sons and a daughter. Baldwin died in January 2008.

Public career
Baldwin, representing the Labor Party, won the seat of Logan at the 1969 Queensland state election, defeating his main opponent, Dick Wood of the Country Party. He represented the electorate for three years, but it was abolished before the 1969 Queensland state election and he moved to the new seat of Redlands, which he held until 1974, when he was defeated by John Goleby of the Country Party.

Referred to as "Red Ted", and "leader of the ratbag radical fringe" when he became president of the Queensland Teachers' Union (QTU) in 1968, Baldwin's work is considered to have laid the foundations for the modern QTU. He was awarded life membership of the union in 1985. In 2001, he was awarded the Commonwealth Centenary Medal for his services to education.

References

Members of the Queensland Legislative Assembly
1922 births
2008 deaths
Australian Labor Party members of the Parliament of Queensland
20th-century Australian politicians